Branko "Brane" Bogunović (24 November 1911 – 1945) was one of the commanders of Serb rebels during the Drvar uprising who later became military officer of the Yugoslav Army in the Fatherland.

On 27 July 1941, Bogunović commanded the Serb rebels who captured Bosansko Grahovo from Ustaše. He joined Yugoslav Army in the Fatherland (Chetniks) and became the commander of the "Gavrilo Princip" Chetnik Regiment, a part of Dinara Chetnik Division. After about a year the regiment under his control became a brigade. In 1942 Bogunović was awarded by Slobodan Jovanović, president of the Yugoslav Government in Exile with Karađorđe's Star, while commander of the Dinara Chetnik Division, Ilija Trifunović Birčanin promoted Bogunović to rank of voivode.

With main intention to save Serbs from the Ustaše, Bogunović and other local Chetnik commanders temporarily accepted the Italians and German occupation. In December 1944, Bogunović was captured by the communist partisans and died in prison in 1945.

Early life 
Before the World War II, Bogunović was a forester.

During World War II
Bogunović was one of the commanders of the rebel units during the Drvar uprising. Bogunović commanded the rebels who captured Bosansko Grahovo from Ustaše on 27 July 1941. He belonged to rebel leaders who joined Yugoslav Army in the Fatherland (Chetniks) after the Italians took over the control of the territory captured in the rebellion. The Chetnik leaders, including Bogunović, wished to save Serbs from their most bloodthirsty enemy - Ustaše, even if they had temporarily to accept rule of Italians and Germans. When in September 1941 Italians peacefully took over control over the territory captured by the rebels during the Drvar uprising, Bogunović became commander of the Chetnik Regiment "Gavrilo Princip" from Bosansko Grahovo.

In January 1942 Bogunović was awarded by Slobodan Jovanović, president of the Yugoslav Government in Exile with Karađorđe's Star. In 1942 the Chetnik Regiment "Gavrilo Princip" became part of the Dinara Chetnik Division. The regiment had two battalions with total number of 800 men armed with 4 heavy machine guns, 8 light machine guns and 70 bullets for gun of each soldier. Also in 1942 Mane Rokvić and Bogunović were promoted to the rank of voivode by the commander of Dinara Chetnik Division, Ilija Trifunović Birčanin. The leaders of the Dinara Division agreed on basic principles of their further struggle, presented in a document composed between 8 and 12 March 1942 and titled "Elaborat of Dinara Division". The main objective of their struggle stipulated in elaborate signed by Momčilo Đujić, Pavle Popović, Pavle Omčikus, Branko Bogunović and Mane Rokvić, was establishing of the Serb nation-state. At the beginning of 1943 the regiment under his command became the Chetnik Brigade "Gavrilo Princip".

The command of Drvar Partisan Brigade sentenced Bogunović to death. According to post-war source published in the communist controlled Yugoslavia, Bogunović was arrested after the communist forces captured Knin in December 1944 and imprisoned in Split prison where he committed suicide. The pro-Chetnik source authored by Miloslav Samardžić claim that Bogunović was thrown through the window.

References

Sources 

 
 
 
 
 
 
 
 
 

1911 births
1945 deaths
People from Drvar
Serbs of Bosnia and Herzegovina
Chetnik personnel of World War II
Royal Yugoslav Army personnel
People killed by Yugoslav Partisans
Yugoslav people who died in prison custody